Miguel Ángel Tabet Balady (24 December 1941 – 7 April 2020) was a Venezuelan theologian, Catholic priest, author, and exegete. Tábet, who was of Lebanese Venezuelan descent, lived and worked in Rome, Italy. He was a professor of biblical hermeneutics, the study of the principles of interpretation of the Bible, at the Pontifical University of the Holy Cross in Rome.

Tabet died from COVID-19 during the COVID-19 pandemic in Rome, Italy, on 7 April 2020, at the age of 78.

Selected books authored

References

1941 births
2020 deaths
Venezuelan theologians
Venezuelan Roman Catholic priests
Academic staff of the Pontifical University of the Holy Cross
Pontifical Lateran University alumni
Central University of Venezuela alumni
Venezuelan people of Lebanese descent
Venezuelan expatriates in Italy
People from Caracas
Clergy from Rome
Deaths from the COVID-19 pandemic in Lazio